Wasserbillig is a town in the commune of Mertert, in eastern Luxembourg.   , Wasserbillig has 2,186 inhabitants, which makes it the largest town in Mertert.  Wasserbillig is the administrative seat of the commune of Mertert.

Geography
Wasserbillig lies at the confluence of the rivers Moselle and Sauer, which form the border with Germany at the town. On the opposite side of the Moselle and linked by a car ferry lies Oberbillig, Germany; on the opposite side of the Sauer and linked by vehicle and rail bridges lies Wasserbilligerbrück, Germany.

History
Around 100 AD, there was already a town where Wasserbillig is situated which the Roman named Biliacum. This is also where the second part of Wasserbillig's name comes from (-billig from Biliacum). It was mainly a transloading harbour for goods coming down the Sauer or by cart. During the construction of the bridge over the Sauer in 1952, remnants of an old Roman bridge were found.

Prominent citizen

Prominent citizens of Wasserbillig include Jacques Santer, born in the town in 1937, who served as Luxembourg's Prime Minister and as President of the European Commission.

Transport
The town's railway station is on the line between Luxemburg City and the German border, connecting east to Trier.

References

Mertert
Towns in Luxembourg
Germany–Luxembourg border crossings